San Ġiljan Aquatic Sports Club is a waterpolo club hailing from the city of St. Julian's in Malta. The club was founded in 1949 by Ġużi Tanti, and was formerly known as Balluta, after the area of St. Julian's were the club is situated.

In 1995, San Ġiljan became the first Maltese club to win a treble, where they went unbeaten all throughout that season.

In 2015, San Ġiljan won their 9th league (and 4th double).

In 2020, San Ġiljan won their 11th league (and 6th double) finishing the season 2020 unbeaten. During this season club players Ben Plumpton and Stephanie Tanti Desjardins were nominated players of the year in male and ladies categories respectively.

In 2021, the team was runner up in the Summer League and won the knock out for the 13th time. Player Ben Plumpton was awarded the player of the year for the second year running

Season 2022 - San Giljan ASC were crowned champions for the 12th time by beating Sliema convincingly in the play-offs. The senior males also won the 14th Knock out final by beating Neptunes ASC and winning the same trophy for a record 7th time in the last 8 years. This summer was a fantastic season for the club when even the ladies team managed to win the knock out trophy against Sirens and were runners up in the championship, losing by just one goal in the last minute of the playoff final against Sirens ASC. Goaler Jake Tanti was nominated and awarded the player of the year.

Season 2023 - The club started off with winning the Enemed Cup by beating rivals Sliema 11-8.

Squad
As of 30 January 2021:

 Matthew Zammit (captain)
 Andreas Galea
 Ben Plumpton
Peter Borg
 Darren Zammit
 Jake Tanti
 Jake Bonavia
 Matthias Otoleva
 Nicholas Bugelli
 Nico Schiavone
 Gianluca Borg
 Russel Caruana
 Jeremy Abela

Head Coach: * Zeljko Kovacic

References

Water polo clubs in Malta
Sports clubs established in 1949
1949 establishments in Malta